Ingavi is a province in the La Paz Department in Bolivia. This is where the Battle of Ingavi occurred on November 18, 1841 and where the World Heritage Site of Tiwanaku is situated.

During the presidency of Eliodoro Villazón the province was founded on December 16, 1909 with Viacha as its capital.

Geography 
Ingavi lies on the southern shore of Lake Titicaca. The Chilla-Kimsa Chata mountain range traverses the province. Some of the highest mountains of the province are listed below:

Subdivision 
Ingavi Province is divided into seven municipalities which are partly further subdivided into cantons.

Population 
The people are predominantly indigenous citizens of Aymara descent.

Tourist attractions 
Some of the tourist attractions of the municipalities are:

 In Viacha Municipality:
 The town of Viacha 
 Viriloco lagoon, a small man made lake in Viacha Canton
 Qalachaka bridge in Viacha Canton
 "Virgen de Letanías" Sanctuary in Viacha Canton
 "Pan de Azúcar" mountain in Viacha Canton
 Fields of the Battle of Ingavi in Viacha Canton
 In Guaqui Municipality:
 Guaqui festivity from July 23 to July 25 celebrated in honour of Apostle James 
 Apostle James church of Guaqui built between 1625 and 1784 
 Guaqui port
 In Tiwanaku Municipality:
 archaeological site of Tiwanaku in Tiwanaku Canton
 Saint Peter church in Tiwanaku
 Willkakuti, the Andean-Amazonic New Year, celebrated on June 21 of every year in the viewpoint of Kimsa Chata mountain in Tiwanaku Canton
 Tiwanaku festivity (Señor de la Exaltación) celebrated in Tiwanaku Canton in September
 In Desaguadero Municipality:
 The international fair of Desaguadero on the Peruvian border
 Desaguadero River with its avifauna and native Aymara and Uru communities along its banks. The river runs along the entire Altiplano.
 In San Andrés de Machaca Municipality:
 Afiani lagoon in San Andrés de Machaca Canton
 The chullpa of Kañoma in San Andrés de Machaca Canton
 The church of San Andrés de Machaca, built between 1806 and 1836
 In Jesús de Machaca Municipality:
 The archaeological site of Qhunqhu Wankani in Jesús de Machaca Canton
 Jesús de Machaca, an indigenous community
 Yakayuni saltflats in Jesús de Machaca Canton where salt exploitation is possible
 Uru Iruwit'u community in Jesús de Machaca Canton and the Uru Iruwit'u museum in Jesús de Machaca
 In Taraco Municipality:
 Taraco Peninsula in Taraco Canton with its archaeological sites:
 Chiripa and its museum
 Qala Uyuni, Pumani and Achacachi Coacollo in Coacollo
 Iwawi (Kolata Quenacache, Ojje Puku, Awichu and Ch'uxña Qala) in Higuagui Grande, Taraco Canton
 Sikuya Island in Taraco Canton
 The church of Taraco dating from 1767 
 Taraco museum in Taraco Canton

See also 
 Awallamaya Lake
 Ch'alla Jawira
 Jach'a Jawira
 Qullpa Jawira
 Thujsa Jawira
 Tiwanaku River

References 

 www.ine.gov.bo / census 2001
 www.ine.gov.bo / estimation 2005

Provinces of La Paz Department (Bolivia)